Dhiren Shakya is a Nepali actor, who has appeared in Nepali feature films and music videos.

Shakya starred in more than a hundred Nepali films in the 1990s and early 2000s. He has received a number of awards throughout his career including National Film Awards for best actor. He also acted in more than 70 music videos.

His successful films include Krodh, Jibandaan, Chino, Simana, Desh Paradesh, Ajambari Maya, Arjun, Insaaf and Janam Janam.

Personal life
He is from Palpa district in western Nepal. He has two daughters. He hails from a military family and had himself joined the British army, only to leave it within six months. His father was in an Indian Gurkha regiment. His older daughter was undergoing army officer's training as of February 2017.

Filmography 
Shakya's first feature film was Pahilo Prem. He then got offered a role in Karja. He went on to act in more than 100 films including Saubhagya, Jun Tara, Simana, Janma Janma Chahari Dushman, Daag, Bhisma-Pratigya, Krodh, Sahar, Apsara, Ansabanda, Deurali, Khelauna, Bhagawan, Desh Paradesh, Bhagyale Jurayo, Kaida, Jiwandaan, Dadagiri, Maile Bhulnai Sakina, Achanak, Dui Mutu Ek Dhadkan, Aadhi Baato and Laxmi Rani.

Shakya had a cameo appearance in the 2016 Newari film Tuyumati. He also appeared in Yatra: A musical vlog. He then appeared in Password (2019).

References

External links 
 

Living people
21st-century Nepalese male actors
1971 births
People from Palpa District
20th-century Nepalese male actors